Hallal may refer to:
 Root of the Hebrew word Hallelujah
 Alternate spelling of Arabic word Halal